Gallery Galschiøt is a workshop in Odense, Denmark, and is 8,000 square meters. Gallery Galschiøt contains the artist Jens Galschiot's workshop.

In the gallery there is access to:

 The Gallery, where a large amount of Galschiot's work is exhibited. Also other artists exhibits with a number of paintings etc. The gallery has also been visited by the Danish princess Marie. 
 The workshop, where Galschiot creates his sculptures. 
 The park, where it is possible to see a lot of Galschiot's biggest sculptures. 
The Gallery has a permanent exhibition, which also contains works of Michael Kvium, Jørgen Boberg, Laurits Tuxen, Wilhelm Marstrand, Gerhard Henning.

History
The buildings was originally a factory, but the artist Galschiot bought the buildings in 1994 and started transforming it into a workshop. All of the buildings have now been transformed, and most of the buildings are open to public.

Besides Gallery Galschiøt, the place also contains a sculpture park, a television production company, an art school and an arrow weave workshop.

References

1994 establishments in Denmark
Buildings and structures in Odense
Tourist attractions in Odense
Art exhibitions in Denmark
Art museums and galleries in Denmark
Sculpture gardens, trails and parks in Denmark
Art schools in Denmark